The 2019 División de Honor de Béisbol was the 34th season of the top Spanish baseball league since its establishment and the 74th Spanish championship overall.

Tenerife Marlins successfully defended their title from the previous season for their 11th championship.

Teams

CD Pamplona did not compete this season.

League table

References

External links
Spanish Baseball and Softball Federation website

División de Honor de Béisbol
2019 in Spanish sport